Daniel Hegan (14 June 1943 – 6 August 2015) was a Scottish-born professional footballer, who represented Northern Ireland at international level.

Career
Hegan won seven caps for Northern Ireland in a career that saw him make 207 appearances for Ipswich Town. He also played for both Black Country rivals, West Bromwich Albion and Wolves, appearing in the 1972 UEFA Cup Final for the latter. He ended his league career by returning to Sunderland, his first English club.

Honours
Ipswich Town
Football League Second Division: 1967–68

Individual
Ipswich Town Hall of Fame: Inducted 2016

References

External links 

Danny Hegan at Pride of Anglia

1943 births
2015 deaths
Footballers from Coatbridge
Scottish footballers
Association footballers from Northern Ireland
Northern Ireland international footballers
Association football midfielders
Albion Rovers F.C. players
Ipswich Town F.C. players
West Bromwich Albion F.C. players
Wolverhampton Wanderers F.C. players
Sunderland A.F.C. players
Coleshill Town F.C. players
Scottish people of Irish descent
Scottish Football League players
English Football League players
Bellshill Athletic F.C. players